UppCon was a Swedish anime and manga convention held annually in Uppsala. The event, which was arranged by the nonprofit organization Uppsalakai, was the largest event of its type in the Nordic countries. During the 1990s the name had been used by a now defunct gaming convention.

The first of the conventions was held in 2001, at the vintage cinema Slottsbiografen. Over the years the event had grown and in 2009 it had more than 3,000 attendants.
 
The conventions usually lasted for three days, from Friday to Sunday, where people with similar interests for example met up to watch anime, compete in cosplay-contests and play videogames.

Many organizations had put up tables to display products they had for sale. Most of them sold imported goods from Japan, such as manga, anime, figures, dolls, clothes and candy such as Pocky.

The eleventh UppCon was held on June 3–5, 2011. In May 2012 it was reported that the UppCon: 12-event would be the last UppCon arranged by its founders.

History

Event history

References

External links 
UppCon.se
Uppsalakai.org

Defunct anime conventions
Swedish culture
Culture in Uppsala